José Ramón Leclerc (born December 19, 1993) is a Dominican professional baseball relief pitcher for the Texas Rangers of Major League Baseball (MLB). He made his MLB debut in 2016.

Professional career

Minor leagues
Leclerc signed with the Texas Rangers as an international free agent on November 20, 2010. Leclerc made his professional debut in 2011 with the DSL Rangers, posting a 3–1 win–loss record with a 2.36 earned run average (ERA) and 27 strikeouts in  innings pitched. He returned to the DSL Rangers for the 2012 season, pitching to a 3–1 record, a 1.54 ERA, and 41 strikeouts in  innings. In 2013, Leclerc pitched for the Hickory Crawdads of the Class A South Atlantic League. He had a 3–4 record with a 3.36 ERA and 77 strikeouts in 59 innings. He spent the 2014 season with the Myrtle Beach Pelicans of the Class A-Advanced Carolina League and finished the season with a 4–1 record with a 3.30 ERA and 79 strikeouts in  innings. Leclerc was worked as a starting pitcher for the Frisco RoughRiders of the Class AA Texas League in 2015. He struggled to a 6–8 record with 5.77 ERA and 98 strikeouts in 103 innings.

The Rangers added Leclerc to their 40-man roster after the 2015 season. He began the 2016 season with Frisco, posting a 0–5 record with a 3.52 ERA and 28 strikeouts in 23 innings. He received a midseason promotion to the Round Rock Express of the Class AAA Pacific Coast League, where he posted a 2–2 record with a 2.72 ERA and 50 strikeouts in 43 innings.

Texas Rangers
The Rangers promoted Leclerc major leagues on July 5, 2016. In all, Leclerc posted a 0–0 record with a 1.80 ERA, 15 strikeouts, and 13 walks in 15 innings (12 games) of major league action.

Leclerc made the Texas Rangers' 2017 Opening Day roster out of spring training. He earned his first career save April 12 vs. Los Angeles Angels, entering the game with one out and a runner on second in the 8th inning with a 6–3 lead before striking out Mike Trout and getting Albert Pujols to fly out. He appeared in ten games before going on the disabled list on May 9 with a sprained right index finger. Before going on the disabled list, Leclerc recorded 18 strikeouts in  innings pitched. Leclerc finished the 2017 season posting a 2–3 record with a 3.94 ERA and 60 strikeouts in  innings.

In 2018, Leclerc split the month of April between the Rangers bullpen and Round Rock, returning to the major league roster for good on April 30. In August, after the Rangers traded Keone Kela to the Pittsburgh Pirates, Leclerc became the Rangers' closer. Leclerc produced his best season to date in 2018, producing a 2–3 record, 1.56 ERA, 85 strikeouts, and 12 saves in  innings pitched. Leclerc was named the 2018 Rangers' Pitcher of the Year by the Dallas-Fort Worth chapter of the Baseball Writers' Association of America.

On March 6, 2019, the Rangers signed Leclerc to a four-year contract extension through the 2022 season, with club options for the 2023 and 2024 seasons. The deal was worth $14.75 million guaranteed over four years, with $12.25 million possible over the two option seasons. In 2019, Leclerc went 2–4 with a 4.33 ERA, 100 strikeouts, and 14 saves over  innings. In 2020, Leclerc pitched in only 2 games due to the pandemic.

On March 29, 2021, it was announced that Leclerc would undergo Tommy John surgery and miss the 2021 season. On March 30, Leclerc was placed on the 60-day injured list. 

After completing rehab, Leclerc returned to MLB action in June 2022. That season he went 0–3 with a 2.83 ERA, 54 strikeouts, and 7 saves over  innings.

References

External links

1993 births
Living people
People from Valverde Province
Dominican Republic expatriate baseball players in the United States
Major League Baseball players from the Dominican Republic
Major League Baseball pitchers
Texas Rangers players
Dominican Summer League Rangers players
Hickory Crawdads players
Myrtle Beach Pelicans players
Gigantes del Cibao players
Frisco RoughRiders players
Round Rock Express players